School of Euphoria is the third studio album by the Danish electrorock band Spleen United. It was released January 30, 2012.

Track listing

Charts

References

2012 albums
Spleen United albums